Patrick O'Neal Baldwin Jr. (born November 18, 2002), nicknamed "PBJ", is an American professional basketball player for the Golden State Warriors of the National Basketball Association (NBA). He played college basketball for the Milwaukee Panthers. He was a consensus five-star recruit and one of the top players in the 2021 class.

High school career
Baldwin played basketball for Hamilton High School in Sussex, Wisconsin. During his freshman year he was part of their 2017–18 team that made the state tournament, losing to senior, Tyrese Haliburton of Oshkosh North 57-56. As a junior, Baldwin averaged 24.3 points and 10.8 rebounds per game, earning Wisconsin Gatorade Player of the Year honors. During the second game of his senior season, Baldwin suffered a season-ending ankle injury. He was named to the rosters for the McDonald's All-American Game, Jordan Brand Classic and Nike Hoop Summit.

Recruiting
Baldwin was a consensus five-star recruit and one of the top players in the 2021 class. On May 12, 2021, he committed to playing college basketball for Milwaukee under the coaching of his father over offers from Duke, Arizona State, Iowa, Kansas, Kentucky, LSU, Michigan, North Carolina, USC and Georgetown. He was also the youngest person ever to receive an offer to play at Duke, receiving the offer in his sophomore year of high school.  He became the highest-rated recruit to ever commit to a Horizon League program.

College career
In his college debut, Baldwin posted 21 points and 10 rebounds in a 75–60 win against North Dakota. On November 23, 2021, he suffered a leg injury in a loss to Bowling Green, forcing him to miss several games. Baldwin suffered an ankle injury on January 5, 2022, in a 63–49 win against Green Bay. Baldwin returned on February 4, 2022 in a 70–60 loss to IPFW, where he shot 5-of-15, and 1-of-6 from 3. He also played the next two conference games against Cleveland State and Northern Kentucky, averaging 30 minutes and 6.5 points while shooting 4-of-19 overall (1-of-11 from 3), before sitting out the rest of the season for undisclosed reasons. Baldwin averaged 12.1 points and 5.8 rebounds per game as a freshman in an injury-plagued season. On April 22, 2022, Baldwin declared for the 2022 NBA draft, forgoing his remaining college eligibility.

Professional career

Golden State Warriors (2022–present) 
Baldwin was selected with the 28th overall pick by the Golden State Warriors in the 2022 NBA draft. On July 6, 2022, the Golden State Warriors announced that they had signed Baldwin.

Baldwin was assigned to the Golden State G-League affiliate, the Santa Cruz Warriors on October 24th, 2022. He then made his NBA debut on October 30th in a 128-114 loss to the Detroit Pistons, playing only in the final minute of the game. 

On December 21st, 2022, Baldwin scored a career-high of 17 points in a 143-113 blowout loss to the Brooklyn Nets, shooting 6-10 overall and 5-8 from three in 23 minutes of play. This performance was followed by a 11 point showing in a 112-107 victory over the Utah Jazz a week later, shooting 4-7 overall and 3-5 from three in just 13 minutes. Baldwin was assigned to the NBA G League again on  February 5, 2023.

National team career
Baldwin represented the United States at the 2021 FIBA Under-19 World Cup in Latvia. He averaged 7.7 points and five rebounds per game, helping the team win the gold medal.

Career statistics

College

|-
| style="text-align:left;"| 2021–22
| style="text-align:left;"| Milwaukee
| 11 || 10 || 28.5 || .344 || .266 || .743 || 5.8 || 1.5 || .8 || .8 || 12.1

Personal life
Baldwin was born in Evanston, Illinois. His father, Pat, was a standout college basketball player at Northwestern and is the former head coach at Milwaukee currently an assistant at Georgetown. His mother, Shawn, played volleyball at Northwestern.

References

External links

Milwaukee Panthers bio
USA Basketball bio

2002 births
Living people
American men's basketball players
Basketball players from Wisconsin
Golden State Warriors draft picks
Golden State Warriors players
McDonald's High School All-Americans
Milwaukee Panthers men's basketball players
People from Waukesha County, Wisconsin
Power forwards (basketball)
Santa Cruz Warriors players
Small forwards
Sportspeople from the Milwaukee metropolitan area